Arkansas City (pronounced Ar-Kansas City) may refer to:

Arkansas City, Arkansas, a town in Desha County, Arkansas, United States
Arkansas City, Kansas, a city in Cowley County, Kansas, United States